"Don't Wanna Dance" is a song by Danish singer-songwriter MØ. The song was released as a digital download in Denmark on 17 January 2014 through Chess Club and RCA Victor as the fifth single from her debut studio album No Mythologies to Follow (2014). The song has peaked at number 25 on the Danish Singles Chart.

Track listing

Charts

Certifications

Release history

References

MØ songs
2013 songs
2014 singles
Songs written by MØ
Songs written by Ronni Vindahl